Podocarpus rubens is a species of conifer in the family Podocarpaceae. It is found in Indonesia, Malaysia, Papua New Guinea, and Timor-Leste.

References

rubens
Trees of Malesia
Trees of Papuasia
Taxonomy articles created by Polbot
Taxa named by David John de Laubenfels